Hebrew Publishing Company is an American Jewish publishing house based in New York City. The company publishes a range of Hebrew prayerbooks and other religious works, as well as many Yiddish publications. The company was founded in the early 1900s in the Lower East Side of New York, and later was situated at the former Bank of United States building for over forty years. The company is described as having the greatest staying power of any Yiddish publisher.

Overview 
The predecessor to the Hebrew Publishing Company was originally formed in 1883 as Rosenbaum & Werbelowsky, Inc. The current company was founded in 1901 by Joseph Werbelowsky and his son David Werbelowsky. The company also operated a bookstore.

While originally founded in the Lower East Side of New York, for a time located on Broadway, after the collapse of the Bank of United States in 1932, the bank building at 77 Delancey Street was taken over by the Hebrew Publishing Company. In 1976, after over forty years at the Delancey Street location, the company moved out from its Lower East Side location.

In 1980, the company was acquired by Charles Lieber (1921–2016) from the Werbelowsky (Werbel) family. Hundreds of the company's publications have been digitized by the Yiddish Book Center research institute.

In its early years, the company geared its productions to newly arrived Orthodox Jewish immigrants who were fluent with Yiddish and Hebrew. The company produced books, educational textbooks, greeting cards, and sheet music. The company also offered a range of books to assist the new immigrants with integrating into American society. The first publication of the Hebrew folk song Zum Gali Gali was released by the Hebrew Publishing Company in 1939. The company is thought to be the first to publish a Yiddish-English dictionary.

In popular culture 
Hebrew Publishing Company was the title of an award-winning novel by the Israeli writer . In the book, the novel's protagonist, Mordechai Schuster, a newly arrived immigrant to the United States, works for his uncle at the Hebrew Publishing Company. The describes the lives of Jewish immigrants in Manhattan in the early 20th century as they engage in petty trade or work as laborers, living in poverty and overcrowded housing. The immigrants read the cheaply produced literature (known as shond in Yiddish) and sentimental stories published by the Hebrew Publishing Company.

Gallery

See also 
 Soncino Press
 ArtScroll
 Kehot Publication Society

References 

Publishing companies based in New York City
Companies established in the 1900s
Publishing companies established in the 1900s
Jewish organizations established in the 1900s
Jewish printing and publishing
1901 establishments in New York City